Depwade Rural District was a rural district in Norfolk, England from 1894 to 1974.

It was formed under the Local Government Act 1894 based on the Depwade rural sanitary district, taking its name from the ancient Depwade hundred. It lay to the east of Diss Urban District.

In 1902 it took in the eastern part of the disbanded Guiltcross Rural District, thus completely encircling Diss except where that town bordered on Suffolk.

Thereafter its borders were unchanged until 1974, when the district was abolished under the Local Government Act 1972 and became part of the South Norfolk district.

Statistics

Parishes

References

Districts of England created by the Local Government Act 1894
Districts of England abolished by the Local Government Act 1972
Historical districts of Norfolk
Rural districts of England